Stonefield are an Australian rock band comprising the four Findlay sisters: Amy on drums and lead vocals, Hannah on lead guitar, Sarah on keyboards, and Holly on bass guitar. They were formed in 2006 as Iotah in Darraweit Guim, a small town in rural Victoria. They changed their name in 2010 and have released four studio albums, Stonefield (October 2013), As Above, So Below (July 2016) — which peaked at No. 19 on the ARIA Albums Chart — Far from Earth (April 2018) and Bent (June 2019).

History 

Stonefield were formed in late 2006 as Iotah in Darraweit Guim, a hamlet in Victoria's Macedon Ranges, by Amy Lee Findlay (born c. 1990) on drums and lead vocals, and her three younger sisters, Hannah (born c. 1993) on lead guitar and vocals, Sarah (born c. 1994) on keyboards and vocals, and Holly (born c. 1998) on bass guitar. The sisters rehearsed in their parents farm shed, "with a '70s-inspired soulful rock sound."

They won the Triple J Unearthed High contest, for secondary school artists, in June 2010 with their song, "Foreign Lover", which was then placed in high rotation on the national radio network. After the win the band changed their name to Stonefield, due to "discovering there was a cabaret performer called iOTA." They released a five-track extended play, Through the Clover (November 2010), with Greg Wales producing via Shock Records. Stonefield were an Unearthed J Award nominee in that year. Amy completed her Bachelor of Australian Popular Music degree in 2010 at Northern Melbourne Institute of TAFE (NMIT) — later renamed as Melbourne Polytechnic.

After the band played at the One Movement Festival in Perth in October 2010 they were approached by a scout for the Glastonbury Festival and were invited to appear at the next year's festival. They played the second slot on the John Peel Stage on 26 June 2011. The Ages Elizabeth Colman felt, "[they] more than held their own at one of the world's biggest music events... the talented foursome's raw vocal power and polished playing, which climaxed with an inspired cover of Led Zeppelin's 'Whole Lotta Love', got the punters rocking." Hannah told Colman, "It was a bit overwhelming"; while Amy admitted, "I almost cried when I got on stage."

Earlier in June 2011 Stonefield had performed at the Melbourne Cricket Ground, providing pre-match entertainment at an Australian Football League match (Geelong vs. Hawthorn), celebrating "Women's Round". The group provided a cover version of Steppenwolf's "Magic Carpet Ride" for Triple J's Like a Version radio segment, which was compiled on the various-artists album Triple J's Like a Version 7 (November 2011). In the following month, Amy appeared on TV celebrity quiz show RocKwiz, performing "Through the Clover" back by the RocKwiz OrKestra and then singing a duet with Nick Barker on a cover version of Small Faces' "Itchycoo Park".

Stonefield's second EP, Bad Reality, appeared in May 2012, which reached the top 100 on the ARIA Albums Chart. Alex Rappel of FasterLouder observed, "[they] certainly know how to rock out in the style of old, and Richie Blackmore and Co would no doubt be impressed by Stonefield's offerings... [they] do not try to offer social commentary or sage wisdom in their latest EP Bad Reality, but rather a rock record that will melt your face off!"

The group released their debut self-titled album, Stonefield, on 11 October 2013, which peaked at No. 21. It was recorded at Sing Sing Studios, Richmond where it was produced and engineered by Ian Davenport for Illusive Sounds. Beat Magazines Krissi Weiss opined, "[the group] has definitely progressed. It's more nuanced, they've evolved beyond being simply riff-based and their harmonic depth is almost transcendental... you can tell none of that was planned. As the listener you can't help but go searching for the familiar but the band are at all times just being [themselves]." They supported its release with a tour of Victoria and parts of New South Wales.

Stonefield released the album's second single, "Love You Deserve", in October 2013, which Tobias Handke of Indie Shuffle, described as, "Classic guitar riffs and pounding percussion merge with the sisters' evocative harmonies, making [it] an easy highlight from [the album]. Oh yeah, how good is The Doors-esque organ?" It won the Rock Work of the Year category at the APRA Music Awards of 2015. The band mostly write their own original material, but also do occasional cover versions. These include "Whole Lotta Love" and "Magic Carpet Ride". In 2015 they covered Fleetwood Mac's "The Chain" on Katie Noonan's album, Songs That Made Me. In 2016 they toured in support of Fleetwood Mac in Australia for three shows.

The group's second album, As Above, So Below, appeared in July 2016 and peaked at No. 19 – their highest charting release. Jaymz Clements of Rolling Stone (Australia) rated it at four-out-of-five stars. theMusic.com.aus Bryget Chrisfield gave it three-and-a-half out-of-five stars and explained, "[it] surpasses all preconceived notions of the sonic terrain these rockin' sisters can effortlessly traverse. Don't freak out, though. The band's killer riffs and headbanging opps prevail."

On 11 December 2017 the band signed with the Flightless record label and debuted new song, "Delusion", on Triple J. In 2018 they toured nationally with Black Rebel Motorcycle Club. The quartet's third album, Far from Earth, was issued in April 2018 and reached the top 100. Libby Webster of The Austin Chronicle rated it at two-and-a-half stars and explained, "[the group]  trudges along haltingly, a chaos of genre. Hammering prog ('Far from Earth') and blistering doom metal ('Through the Storm'), their momentum wanes with milder moments of psychedelia." Happy Mag placed the album at no.16 on their list of "The 25 best psychedelic rock albums of the 2010s" in 2019.

L.A. Records Madison Desler caught their gig at Los Angeles' The Bootleg club in that same month, "they bashed through cuts off their new album, Far from Earth. 'Delusion', a mix of distorted psych and stormy desert rock had drummer and lead singer Amy Findlay showing off her impressive vocals, while the dark, dance beat of 'Visions' got the packed crowd to shimmy and slide."

In 2019, the Australian band King Gizzard and the Lizard Wizard brings along Stonefield and the band Orb as support acts. Stonefield also appears in the King Gizzard's concert film Chunky Shrapnel in 2020, playing the song "A Brief History of Planet Earth".

Amy Cavanagh, Stonefield's drummer, is married to Michael Cavanagh, the drummer for King Gizzard and the Lizard Wizard.

Members 

 Amy Cavanagh (née Findlay) – vocals, drums (2006–present)
 Hannah Findlay – guitar (2006–present)
 Holly Findlay – bass guitar (2006–present)
 Sarah Findlay – keyboards, vocals (2006–present)

Discography

Studio albums

Extended plays

Singles

Notes

Awards

AIR Awards
The Australian Independent Record Awards (commonly known informally as AIR Awards) is an annual awards night to recognise, promote and celebrate the success of Australia's Independent Music sector.

|-
| AIR Awards of 2011
| Through the Clover
| Best Independent Single/EP
| 
|-

APRA Awards
The APRA Awards are presented annually from 1982 by the Australasian Performing Right Association (APRA), "honouring composers and songwriters". They commenced in 1982.

! 
|-
| 2013 
| "Bad Reality" (Amy, Hannah, Sarah and Holly Findlay)
| Song of the Year
| 
| 
|-

J Award
The J Awards are an annual series of Australian music awards that were established by the Australian Broadcasting Corporation's youth-focused radio station Triple J. They commenced in 2005.

|-
| J Awards of 2010
|themselves
| Unearthed Artist of the Year
|

Music Victoria Awards
The Music Victoria Awards are an annual awards night celebrating Victorian music. They commenced in 2006.

! 
|-
| Music Victoria Awards of 2014
| Stonefield
| Best Regional Act
| 
|rowspan="4"|  
|-
| Music Victoria Awards of 2018
| Stonefield
| Best Regional Act/Outer Suburban Act
| 
|-
|rowspan="2"| Music Victoria Awards of 2019
| Stonefield
| Best Regional Act/Outer Suburban Act
| 
|-
| Bent
| Best Rock/Punk Album
| 
|-

References

External links 

 
 Stonefield on Triple J Unearthed

All-female bands
APRA Award winners
Australian hard rock musical groups
Australian psychedelic rock music groups
Family musical groups
Sibling musical groups
Musical quartets
Musical groups established in 2006
Victoria (Australia) musical groups
Universal Music Group artists